Richmond Senior High School is a high school located in Rockingham, North Carolina. Richmond Senior is the only high school located in Richmond County. It is part of the Richmond County School System, and was established in 1972.

Overview 
With a strong history in academics, the school has the distinction as a U.S. Department of Education Blue Ribbon School of Excellence. Richmond Senior High School also offers many Advanced Placement (AP) classes such as United States Government and Politics, European History, Chemistry, Psychology, Environmental Science, and English Literature and Composition. In addition to the many Advanced Placement and Honors level courses offered, RSHS maintains a thriving Trade and Industrial Technology curriculum, a few of the courses offered are Firefighter Technology, Horticulture, Drafting, and Automotive Maintenance.

Richmond Senior High School is a one-to-one computing institution. Every student receives an HP Laptop that they are able to keep and use throughout the school year. Students use these devices in class every day and for online homework assignments.

Athletics 
The school is highly recognized for its football team, the Richmond Raiders, from which a high proportion of players have played in the NFL compared to schools of similar sizes across the nation.

Notable alumni 
 Wayne Goodwin, former state legislator and North Carolina Democratic Party Chairman

 Brian Moehler, MLB pitcher
 Alvin Morman, MLB pitcher
 Franklin Stubbs, MLB player and 1988 World Series champion with the Los Angeles Dodgers
 Mike Thomas, MLB pitcher

NFL players
 Dannell Ellerbe, NFL linebacker and two-time Super Bowl champion
 James Hamilton, NFL linebacker
 Tony Horne, NFL wide receiver/return specialist, Super Bowl XXIV champion with the St. Louis Rams and All-Pro selection in 1999
 Melvin Ingram, NFL linebacker for the Kansas City Chiefs and three-time Pro Bowl selection
 Mike Quick, five-time Pro Bowl selection and two-time All-Pro wide receiver for the Philadelphia Eagles
 Harry Stanback, NFL defensive end
 Oscar Sturgis, NFL defensive end and Super Bowl XXX champion with the Dallas Cowboys
 Doug Thomas, NFL wide receiver
 Michael Waddell, NFL cornerback
 Perry Williams, NFL cornerback and two-time Super Bowl champion with the New York Giants

References

1972 establishments in North Carolina
Educational institutions established in 1972
Public high schools in North Carolina
Schools in Richmond County, North Carolina